Walter Francis K. Torres (born December 3, 1967) is a Filipino sports administrator and former fencer who currently serves as a commissioner of the Philippine Sports Commission since 2022. Torres competed in the individual foil event at the 1992 Summer Olympics.

References

External links
 

1967 births
Living people
Olympic fencers of the Philippines
Fencers at the 1992 Summer Olympics
Filipino male foil fencers
Filipino sports executives and administrators